Adams Basin is a hamlet  in Monroe County, New York, United States.  The hamlet is the location of the Adams-Ryan House, a historic Erie Canal inn listed on the National Register of Historic Places in 1985 and now operated as a bed and breakfast.

Adams Basin is located in the northwestern corner of the town of Ogden. Though fully surrounded by the Spencerport zip code of 14559, the hamlet has its own post office with zip code 14410. Adams Basin is within the Brockport Central School District

References

Hamlets in New York (state)
Hamlets in Monroe County, New York